Copromorpha roepkei is a moth in the family Copromorphidae. It is found on Java.

References

Natural History Museum Lepidoptera generic names catalog

Copromorphidae
Moths described in 1953